Pauly, a.k.a. The Pauly Shore Show, is an American sitcom series that aired on Fox from March 3 until April 7, 1997, starring Pauly Shore.  It was cancelled after five episodes, leaving two episodes unaired.

Plot
Pauly Sherman is the slacker son of wealthy businessman Edward Sherman.  One day, Edward marries Dawn Delaney, a younger woman with her own son.  They move in with Pauly, who makes it his mission to ruin their relationship.

Cast
Pauly Shore as Pauly Sherman
Charlotte Ross as Dawn Delaney
David Dukes as Edward Sherman
Kevin Weisman as Burger
Amy Hill as Sumi
Theo Greenly as Zachary Delaney

Episodes

External links 
 
 

1997 American television series debuts
1997 American television series endings
1990s American sitcoms
Fox Broadcasting Company original programming
Television series by 20th Century Fox Television
Television series by 3 Arts Entertainment
Television shows set in Los Angeles